Pseudopyxis is a genus of flowering plants belonging to the family Rubiaceae.

Its native range is Southeastern China, Japan.

Species:

Pseudopyxis depressa 
Pseudopyxis heterophylla 
Pseudopyxis monilirhizoma

References

Rubiaceae
Rubiaceae genera